Alone in a Crowd is an album by Catch 22, and the first release featuring the band's second lineup (featuring Jeff Davidson as lead vocalist, replacing Tomas Kalnoky). It was recorded in June 2000.

Composition
The album features a song trilogy, "What Goes Around Comes Around", "Bloomfield Avenue" and "Neverending Story", which follows two young lovers who commit multiple acts of homicide on a cross-country spree before finally succumbing to their own personal demons. Themes on the album include a longing for childhood and home, and a general feeling of alienation from the rest of the world.

The end of the album features seven blank tracks, each 22 seconds long, followed by a bonus track that starts after 22 seconds of silence, bringing the album to a total of 22 tracks.

Release
To promote the album, the band made a music video for "Point the Blame", the album's first single. However, due to financial problems, the video was never completed. The band closed the year touring the US with Reel Big Fish. In March 2001, the band toured across Canada with AFI. In May and June 2001, the band toured Europe as part of the Deconstruction Tour.

On January 30, 2016, Jeff Davidson joined the band to perform the album in full at Starland Ballroom in Sayreville, NJ.

Track listing

If you take the seconds of the CD length and subtract the minutes from it, the difference is 22, adding to the other, almost subliminal, 22s found throughout the album.

Personnel
Pat Kays - bass guitar
Mike Soprano - trombone, vocals
Ryan Eldred - saxophone, vocals
Chris Greer - drum kit
Kevin Gunther - trumpet, vocals
Pat Calpin - guitar
Jeff Davidson - vocals

References

2000 albums
Catch 22 (band) albums
Victory Records albums